The Kerala Sahitya Akademi Award for Literary Criticism is an award given every year by the Kerala Sahitya Akademi (Kerala Literary Academy) to Malayalam writers for writing literary criticism. It is one of the twelve categories of the Kerala Sahitya Akademi Award.

Awardees

See also

 List of awards for contributions to culture

References

Awards established in 1966
Kerala Sahitya Akademi Awards
Malayalam literary awards
Literary critic awards
1966 establishments in Kerala